Phyllobiini is a weevil tribe in the subfamily Entiminae.

Genera 
Amphorygma – Aphrastus – Argoptochus – Brachymerinthus – Brachymiscus – Brachyxystus – Catorygma – Dichorrhinus – Drepanoderes – Epherina – Epitosus – Euphyllobiomorphus – Evopes – Evotus – Henschia – Hormotrophus – Idaspora – Metacinops – Nonnotus – Oarius – Oedecnemidius – Opitomorphus – Parascythopus – Pectonyx – Phlyda – Phyllobioides – Phyllobius – Proxyrodes – Pseudomyllocerus – Pseudosystates – Rhinoscythropus – Rhinospathe – Titinia

References 

 Schönherr, C.J. 1826: Curculionidum dispositio methodica cum generum characteribus, descriptionibus atque observationibus variis seu Prodromus ad Synonymiae Insectorum, partem IV. Fleischer, Lipsiae: X + 338 pp.
 Alonso-Zarazaga, M.A.; Lyal, C.H.C. 1999: A world catalogue of families and genera of Curculionoidea (Insecta: Coleoptera) (excepting Scolytidae and Platypodidae). Entomopraxis, Barcelona.

External links 

Entiminae
Beetle tribes